Ice VII is a cubic crystalline form of ice. It can be formed from liquid water above 3 GPa (30,000 atmospheres) by lowering its temperature to room temperature, or by decompressing heavy water (D2O) ice VI below 95 K. (Different types of ice, from ice II to ice XVIII, have been created in the laboratory at different temperatures and pressures.  Ordinary water ice is known as ice Ih in the Bridgman nomenclature.)  Ice VII is metastable over a wide range of temperatures and pressures and transforms into low-density amorphous ice (LDA) above .  Ice VII has a triple point with liquid water and ice VI at 355 K and 2.216 GPa, with the melt line extending to at least  and 10 GPa. Ice VII can be formed within nanoseconds by rapid compression via shock-waves. It can also be created by increasing the pressure on ice VI at ambient temperature. At around 5 GPa, Ice VII becomes the tetragonal Ice VIIt.

Like the majority of ice phases (including ice Ih), the hydrogen atom positions are disordered. In addition, the oxygen atoms are disordered over multiple sites.  The structure of ice VII comprises a hydrogen bond framework in the form of two interpenetrating (but non-bonded) sublattices. Hydrogen bonds pass through the center of the water hexamers and thus do not connect the two lattices. Ice VII has a density of about 1.65 g cm−3 (at 2.5 GPa and ), which is less than twice the cubic ice density as the intra-network O–O distances are 8% longer (at 0.1 MPa) to allow for interpenetration. The cubic unit cell has a side length of 3.3501 Å (for D2O, at 2.6 GPa and ) and contains two water molecules.

Ice VII is the only disordered phase of ice that can be ordered by simple cooling, and it forms (ordered) ice VIII below 273 K up to ~8 GPa. Above this pressure, the VII–VIII transition temperature drops rapidly, reaching 0 K at ~60 GPa. Thus, ice VII has the largest stability field of all of the molecular phases of ice. The cubic oxygen sub-lattices that form the backbone of the ice VII structure persist to pressures of at least 128 GPa; this pressure is substantially higher than that at which water loses its molecular character entirely, forming ice X. In high pressure ices, protonic diffusion (movement of protons around the oxygen lattice) dominates molecular diffusion, an effect which has been measured directly.

Natural occurrence
Scientists hypothesize that ice VII may comprise the ocean floor of Europa as well as extrasolar planets (such as Gliese 436 b, and Gliese 1214 b) that are largely made of water.

In 2018, ice VII was identified among inclusions found in natural diamonds.  Due to this demonstration that ice VII exists in nature, the International Mineralogical Association duly classified ice VII as a distinct mineral. The ice VII was presumably formed when water trapped inside the diamonds retained the high pressure of the deep mantle due to the strength and rigidity of the diamond lattice, but cooled down to surface temperatures, producing the required environment of high pressure without high temperature.

References

External links
 
 

Water ice
Cubic minerals